Cabo is a 2010 card game by Melissa Limes and Mandy Henning that  involves memory and manipulation based on the classic Golf card game and similar to Rat-a-Tat Cat (1995). The game uses a dedicated deck of cards with each suit numbered from 0 to 13, and certain numbers being marked as "Peek", "Spy" or "Swap". The objective of the game is for each player to minimize the sum of their own cards, four of which are played face-down to the table at the start of a round. Face-down cards may be revealed and swapped by card effects.

Cabo combines elements from shedding and matching type card games. It is similar to the traditional card game Golf and the 1995 Mensa Select award-winner Rat-a-Tat Cat.

Cabo can also be played with a standard playing card deck, and goes under names including Cambio, Pablo and Cactus.

Gameplay 
Each player is dealt 4 cards, face down. After each deal, players may peek at any 2 of their own cards.

In clockwise order, players do any of three things:
pick a card from the draw pile, and either keep the card (placing one of their own cards on the discard pile) or discard it (if the card drawn and discarded is a choice card, the choice card can be used if so desired).
 pick a card from the discard pile and place one of their own cards on the discard pile
 call "Cabo"

Whenever a player discards cards from their hand, they may discard any number of cards of the same rank. If a player discards all of their cards they are considered safe and their value can not move from 0. If a player draws then discards a "choice" card, they may choose to use its ability, as follows:

 7 or 8: the player may "peek" at one of their own cards
 9 or 10: "spy" on one of another player's cards
 11 or 12: swap any two cards on the table, of any player

When a player calls cabo, the other players each get one more turn and then everyone has to turn their hidden cards face-up, and lay down the cards from their hand. The player with the lowest score wins.

Editions and variants 
The second edition of Cabo, published by Bezier Games, was published in April 2019. It includes changes such as new artwork, modified rules, a scorepad, and four player reference cards. Rules modifications include:

 Plays 2–4 players (instead of 2–5)
 Cards taken from the discard pile remain face up for the rest of the game (instead of always keeping cards face down)
 Penalty for non-matching cards: Keep all cards including the one drawn — one more per additional cards that do not match (instead of no penalty)
 10 point penalty for missing a cabo call (instead of 5)
 All players score the sum of their points; if the caller has (or is tied for) the lowest sum, they get 0 points (instead of the lowest player always receiving 0 points)
 The round ends after a call or when the deck runs out (instead of just when Cabo is called)
 Limit of one reset to 50 when your score = 100 exactly (instead of unlimited resets)

Silver 
In August 2019, Bezier Games released Silver, a variant with additional rules modifications and a werewolf theme. Changes include:

 New artwork to reflect the theme
 Every card value features a different ability (instead of only Peek, Swap, and Spy on some cards)
 Plays 2–4 players
 Five cards in front of each player (instead of four)
 A penalty for failing to match cards in an exchange
 Four rounds of play in a game (instead of playing to 100 points)
 The lowest sum of points does not automatically score zero
 Removal of the kamikaze rule
 Removal of the 100-point rule

Folk versions

Alvaro JuanJon Edition 

A version called Cobo played with standard playing cards has the following rules:
 Red kings (13) are worth 0 points
 8 or 9 - 'spy' (peek) at someone else's card.
 10 - peek at one of your own cards.
 Jacks (12) - swap cards with any other player (but neither player can look at the card they exchange)
 25 point penalty for calling "Cobo" and not actually having the lowest score in that round.
 -10 points if you call "Cobo" and are left with zero points.
 If a player tries to "match a card" incorrectly, the player has to pick up another card from the deck as well as the card they incorrectly discarded.

Hulimavu Kobo

This variant played with standard playing cards has the following card effects:
 7 or 8: blind swap, replace any of your cards with another player without looking
 9 or 10: you can see one of your cards
 11 or 12/ J or Q: see and swap, you can see another players card and swap with your card

Hyderabadi Kaboo 

 you cannot pick from the discard pile
 if you discard all of your cards, you automatically win the game and the game ends

References 

Draw and discard games
Year of introduction missing
Card games introduced in 2010